Polyhymno luteostrigella, the polyhymno moth, is a moth of the family Gelechiidae. It is found in the United States, where it has been recorded from Texas to Florida, north to Connecticut and Kentucky. It is also found in Cuba and Puerto Rico.

References

Moths described in 1874
Polyhymno